HMS Mars was a two-deck 80-gun second rate ship of the line of the Royal Navy, launched on 1 July 1848 at Chatham Dockyard.

She served as a supply carrier in the Crimean War, and was fitted with screw propulsion in 1855. She then saw service in the Mediterranean. In 1869 she was moored in the River Tay. She served there as a training ship until 1929, when she was sold and towed to Thos. W. Ward's Inverkeithing yard to be broken up.

References
Citations

Bibliography

Lavery, Brian (2003) The Ship of the Line – Volume 1: The development of the battlefleet 1650–1850. Conway Maritime Press. .

Ships of the line of the Royal Navy
Vanguard-class ships of the line
Ships built in Chatham
1848 ships